Manampatrana  is a river in the region of Atsimo-Atsinanana in south-eastern Madagascar. It flows into the Indian Ocean near Farafangana.

References

Atsimo-Atsinanana
Rivers of Madagascar

fr:Manampatrana